Hey Mama was a contemporary rock band from Cambridge, Massachusetts.

History
The band Hey Mama stemmed from the folk-rock duo Avi & Celia. Avi Salloway and Celia Woodsmith teamed up Ben Kogan and Jared Seabrook to form Hey Mama in January 2009.  The debut album, Hey Mama, was released on December 1, 2009. Hey Mama was recorded with Grammy Award nominated producer Jack Gauthier. The record also featured guest appearances from The Tecumseh Strings, a chamber group of Boston string players.

Hey Mama was known for their high-energy performances. The electrified sound blends new and old with Woodsmith's wailing on the washboard. The Boston Globe calls it, “Sexy roots swagger with populist fire.” The band has played over 400 shows throughout the United States and Canada,  building a loyal fan base and has received praise from Yankee, the Boston Globe, and NHPR.

Hey Mama has played several concerts supporting Taj Mahal, Leon Russell and Big Brother and the Holding Company.

Former members
 Avi Salloway
 Celia Woodsmith
 Jared Seabrook
 Paul Chase
 Ben Kogan, 2009

Instrumentation
 Avi Salloway; Acoustic Guitar and Electric Guitar, Harmonica, Vocals
 Celia Woodsmith; Vocals, Acoustic Guitar, Washboard
 Jared Seabrook; Drums
 Paul Chase; Electric Bass and Double Bass

Discography
 Hey Mama (2009)
 Let It Rise (2008)
 Off the Floor (2007)

External links

The Boston Globe
Seven Days VT
Yankee Magazine
State of Mind Magazine
Ravings of a Mad Music Man
pH Balanced
Tea Party Boston
WERS, Emerson College
Ryans Smashing Life

External links
 Official Website
 Myspace

American blues rock musical groups
American folk rock groups
Musical groups from Massachusetts